Trigonopoma is a genus of cyprinid fish found in Southeast Asia. There are two described species in this genus.

Species
 Trigonopoma gracile (Kottelat, 1991)
 Trigonopoma pauciperforatum (M. C. W. Weber & de Beaufort, 1916) (Redstripe rasbora)

References

External links 
 

 
Fish of Asia